The Sanremo Music Festival 2015 (65° Festival della Canzone Italiana di Sanremo 2015) was the 65th annual Sanremo Music Festival, a television song contest held at the Teatro Ariston in Sanremo, Liguria, between 10 and 14 February 2015 and broadcast by Rai 1. The show was presented by two previous winners of the festival, singers Arisa and Emma, along with Spanish television presenter and model Rocío Muñoz Morales, and director of the show Carlo Conti.

The Big Artists section included 20 established Italian artists, competing with a song each, while 8 artists performed in the Newcomers' section. On 13 February 2015, Giovanni Caccamo won the Newcomers' section with "Ritornerò da te", also receiving the "Emanuele Luzzati" Award, the Critics' Award "Mia Martini", and the Press, Radio, TV & Web Award "Lucio Dalla". He also co-wrote the song "Adesso e qui (nostalgico presente)", performed by Malika Ayane, which received the Critics' Award "Mia Martini" in the Big Artists section. The "Lucio Dalla" award in the Big Artists section received Nek with "Fatti avanti amore".

The winner of the "Big Artist" category was operatic pop trio Il Volo with their entry "Grande amore". As a result, the group was eligible to represent Italy in the Eurovision Song Contest 2015. During the press conference, it was announced that they accepted to compete in the European contest, therefore they performed during the final on 23 May 2015, which was held in Vienna, Austria, finishing in third place. A total of twenty prizes were awarded during the festival.

Presenters and personnel
During the press conference following the end of the Sanremo Music Festival 2014, rumours emerged suggesting Carlo Conti as a possible successor of Fabio Fazio as the show's presenter. On 24 April 2014, Rai 1 director Giancarlo Leone, while presenting the TV show Si può fare!, officially confirmed Conti as the presenter of the 65th Sanremo Music Festival. On 17 June 2014, Conti himself announced he would also be the artistic director of the show.

In December 2014, following several rumours, singers Arisa and Emma, winners of the contest in 2014 with "Controvento" and in 2012 with "Non è l'inferno", respectively, were confirmed as the show's co-presenters. In January 2015, a third female co-presenter, Spanish actress Rocio Muñoz Morales, was announced by Conti, during a pre-festival press conference.

The stage scenography was designed by Riccardo Bicchini, and was created to reproduce a flower from the inside. Maurizio Pagnussat was chosen as the TV director of the programme. Carlo Conti, Ivana Sabatini, Leopoldo Siano, Emanuele Giovannini, Martino Clericetti, Max Novaresi, Riccardo Cassini and Mario D'Amico were chosen as the show's writers. As in the previous years, during their performances, competing artists were accompanied by the Sanremo Festival Orchestra, directed by a conductor chosen by each single artist. The main orchestra conductor for non-competing performances was Pinuccio Pirazzoli.

Participants and results summary

Other awards
 Best Cover Performance: Nek – "Se telefonando"
 Sanremo Music Festival Ambassador in the World: Al Bano
 Sanremo Music Festival Ambassador in the World: Romina Power
 Career Award: Pino Donaggio, for the 50th anniversary of the song "Io che non vivo" with 80 million records sold
 FIMI Platinum Award: Saint Motel – "My Type"
 City of Sanremo Award: Giorgio Panariello

Performances, guests and voting details

First night

During the first night, 10 out of 20 acts in the Big Artists section performed their competing song. Their performances were voted by the public, as well as by journalists in the press room, with equal weight. A first rank was compiled, but none of the entries was eliminated.

In the first part of the show, the Anania family, composed of a couple with 16 children, was invited to take part in the show to talk about being the most numerous family in Italy.
The first musical guest of the night was Italian singer-songwriter Tiziano Ferro. He appeared on stage performing a medley of the songs "Non me lo so spiegare", "Sere nere" and "Il regalo più grande". After being briefly interviewed by Conti, he sang his single "Incanto".
After Dear Jack's performance, actor Alessandro Siani was introduced by Carlo Conti. He performed a comic monologue in which he joked with Conti and the Sanremo Music Festival audience, and he talked about the economic crisis, citing politics including Matteo Salvini and Matteo Renzi. He concluded his performance with a tribute to Pino Daniele.

Later during the night, Italian singer Albano Carrisi reunited with former wife and longtime stage partner Romina Power, performing their hits "Cara terra mia", "Ci sarà" and "Felicità". Albano also performed his 1996 entry "È la mia vita". Before leaving the stage, the couple received a special award as "Ambassadors of the Sanremo Music Festival in the world".
Another guest of the show was Italian doctor Fabrizio Pulvirenti, who survived the 2014 Ebola virus epidemic. He was interviewed by presenter Carlo Conti. 
Comedians ensemble Boiler also appeared for a sketch during the night, in which they played fake journalists.
After the last competing performance, American band Imagine Dragons performed their hits "Demons" and "I Bet My Life".
Comedian Francesco Cicchella imitated Canadian singer Michael Bublé, and finally, co-presenters Arisa and Emma dueted on Renato Zero's "Il carrozzone".

Big Artists performances during the first night

Second night

The second night of the 64th Sanremo Music Festival, held on 11 February 2015, began with the Newcomers' competition. Four acts, divided into two different challenges, performed their competing songs. For each challenge, the winning entry, determined by combining televotes with the points awarded by journalists in the press room, was admitted to the semi-final of the contest, while the remaining one was eliminated.
After the Newcomers' challenges, dancing ensemble Pilobolus performed a number based on shadow games, based on the song "Empire State of Mind". Then, Conti launched the Big Artists performances. During the night, the ten competing artists which did not appear during the previous episode sang their entries, and were voted by public and journalists, resulting in a partial ranking.

Big Artists performances werte interlaced by several guest appearances. American chef Joe Bastianich appeared on stage with presenter Carlo Conti, and performed a cover version of "Quando, quando, quando" by Tony Renis. Italian singer-songwriter Biagio Antonacci later performed a medley of his hits "Se io se lei", "Dolore e forza", "Pazzo di lei" and "Sognami", as well as Pino Daniele's "Quando".
South African-American actress Charlize Theron was interviewed by Carlo Conti. Shortly after, co-presenter Rocío Muñoz Morales danced Mango's "Lei verrà" as a tribute to the singer-songwriter, who died in December 2014.
Comedian Angelo Pintus also performed a monologue. Pino Donaggio appeared on stage to celebrate the 50th anniversary of the song "Io che non vivo", launched during the Sanremo Music Festival 1965. He received a special award for the song. Actors Claudio Amendola and Luca Argentero promoted their film Noi e la Giulia, with Amendola also performing a fragment of the song "...E dimmi che non vuoi morire". Austrian singer Conchita Wurst presented her new single "Heroes". After interviewing former footballer Javier Zanetti, Carlo Conti introduced the last guest of the night, Marlon Roudette, who sang "When the Beat Drops Out".

Newcomers' performances during the second night

Big Artists performances during the second night

Third night
The third night of the 65th Sanremo Music Festival started with the Newcomers' competition. Two challenges took place, to determine two of the semi-finalists. Based on public votes and on points awarded by the quality jury, Giovanni Caccamo and Amara advanced to the next stage of te competition, while Serena Brancale and Rakele were eliminated.

The rest of the night was based on covers performed by the acts of the Big Artists section. Their performances were divided into five different groups composed of four acts each. Public votes and a jury composed of journalists determined the winning entry for each group. An additional voting session, based on the same rules, later took place among the five winning entries, to determine the winner of the Cover Award. Nek's performance of "Se telefonando", originally by Mina. Votes received during the night did not contribute to determine the winner of the main competition.

Newcomers' performances during the third night

Big Artists performances during the third night

Fourth night

Newcomers' performances during the fourth night

Big Artists performances during the fourth night

Fifth night

Big Artists final – first round

Big Artists final – second round

Other awards

Critics' Award "Mia Martini" – Big Artists section

Critics' Award "Mia Martini" – Newcomers' section

Press, Radio, TV & Web Award "Lucio Dalla" – Big Artists section

Press, Radio, TV & Web Award "Lucio Dalla" – Newcomers' section

Ratings

Discography

Singles

Albums

Solo albums by performing artists

Compilation albums

Explanatory notes
A  The jury voting during the final for the Newcomers' section and for the Big Artists section was composed of: Claudio Cecchetto, Camila Raznovich, Carlo Massarini, Andrea Mirò, Paolo Beldì, Giovanni Veronesi, Marino Bartoletti and Massimo Bernardini.

References

External links 
 Official website

2015 in Italian music
2015 in Italian television
2015 song contests
Eurovision Song Contest 2015
Sanremo Music Festival by year